A Best (stylized as  BEST) is the first greatest hits album by Japanese singer-songwriter Ayumi Hamasaki. It was released on March 28, 2001, by Avex Trax and Avex Music Creative Inc. Hamasaki had originally planned to release the greatest hits album after her 2002 studio album I Am..., but the idea was denied by Avex head staff. Instead, Avex released the album in 2001, which caused conflict between the label and Hamasaki. The compilation was released in two different formats including a physical and a digital release. Seven different artworks were released in several editions of the album. The album includes one new track, three re-recorded tracks, and the rest of previously released singles.

A Best was appreciated by contemporary critics who noted the quality and memorability of the tracks. Many also labeled the album as one of the best representations of Japanese pop music. Released purposely against fellow Japanese musician Hikaru Utada's studio album Distance for direct competition, the compilation entered at number two on Japan's Oricon Albums Chart. It reached number one the following week, and sold over five million units in Japan. The album's lead single "M" was released on December 3, 2000, and reached the top spot on the Oricon Singles Chart.

In support of Hamasaki's third studio album Duty and A Best, Hamasaki held two concerts at Japan's Tokyo Dome. The tour was a commercial success, and one live recording was released. Since its release, the album brought Hamasaki a number of accolades and award nominations with a series of successful recognition throughout Eastern and Western publications. In 2016, Hamasaki re-released the album on that same date as a 15th-anniversary celebration; this included new material and formats. Hamasaki will promote the re-release with a Japanese concert tour, entitled Made in Japan.

Background and material

Hamasaki had revealed plans in wanting to release her first greatest hits after a "couple more albums" when she released her 2002 studio album I Am.... However, in early 2001, Hamasaki's record label Avex Trax announced the plans for the release of a greatest hits package with an undisclosed date at the time. Avex had contacted Hamasaki one day, and stated that they intended to release the album on a specific date unbeknownst to her. Avex decided to purposely release the album against fellow Japanese recording artist Hikaru Utada's second studio album Distance on March 28, 2001 for direct competition of sales; Utada had previously sold over 10 million units for their debut album First Love (1999).

Hamasaki originally thought the statement was a "joke", but was against the overall idea. She felt that majority of her single material for the album was "insufficient" at the time. She said, "It was too early for release. My 'best album' was something I dreamt of doing my way, but one day the company came to me and said 'your best album has to be released on this month and on this day." The date announcement was a widely controversial topic throughout Japanese and Western media, which claimed the two singers were "rivals" on both personal and professional circumstances. Hamasaki denied the claims, but decided to take more control of her future material and asserted that she didn't want to be marketed as a "product" by Avex.

During the album's production and mastering phase, Avex requested Hamasaki to hand-pick her favourite singles past-2001. Nearly every single from her three studio albums: A Song for ××, Loveppears (1999), and Duty appeared on the compilation album.  Knowing that the material was still insufficient, Hamasaki reluctantly re-recorded three tracks; "Trust", "Depend on You", and the non-album single "A Song for...". Hamasaki had to re-record the tracks whilst recording the material for I Am.... The track "Boys & Girls" was re-composed by Japanese musician Dai Nagao, whilst retaining Hamasaki's original vocals. The track "End Roll" was re-recorded by Hamasaki, and re-composed by Nagao. Hamasaki selected the tracks "M" and the non-single "Who..." to be included on the album; "Who..." did not feature the hidden track "Kanariya", which appeared on Loveppears. "M" appeared on the I Am... album, and whilst the studio album also spawned the singles "Evolution" and "Never Ever" before the compilation's release, they were not included.

Release
A Best was released on March 28, 2001 in two formats; a standard compact disc, and a digital download. Both the CD and digital download includes 16 tracks, with the physical editions housed in a cardboard sleeve. The cardboard sleeve of the album was photographed by Keita Haginiwa, whilst the booklet was designed by Shigeru Kasai from RICE. The black-and-white cover features a close-up shot of Hamasaki, with a tear falling down her face. The cover was reported by several publications at the time, many whom believed it was a visual response to the album's release and reports of her and Utada's rivalry. For each six albums released had six different artworks, each having different close-up poses by Hamasaki. A Best is Hamasaki's first album to embody her "" logo on the front of the cover.

Critical responses
A Best received positive reviews from music critics. Mori Tomoyoki from Amazon Japan was positive in his review. Tomoyoki stated that, whilst her initial presentation as an artist was described as "idle", he labelled the album's material as "excellent". He also felt the lyrical content, whilst "shocking", represented Hamasaki well. Hiromi Yonemoto from Yeah!! J-Pop! was positive in his review. Yonemoto commended the album's quality, and commented that the album was the "centerpiece" of Hamasaki's sales success, concluding that the material is "memorable." A staff reviewer for Tower Records commended the album's quality and felt that while the album featured more "heart" than her previous work. The reviewer called the album "familiar" and filled with "Ayu charm." Alexey Eremenko from AllMusic selected many tracks from the album as the album and Hamasaki's best moments in her career.

Commercial performances
Before its release, Hamasaki commented that she was anxious about the album's first week sales. She commented that she felt it might "be my last album... It's possible I'll may never get the chance again". During a competitive week with Utada's album Distance, A Best debuted at number two on Japan's Oricon Albums Chart. This resulted in Distance debuting atop the album chart, making it Hamasaki's second album after her 1999 remix album Ayu-mi-x not to enter the top spot. Hamasaki's album sold over 2.874 million units in its first week of sales, whilst Utada's album sold three million in its first week. This made A Best the second fastest selling album in Japanese music history, just behind Distance at first place. The following week, A Best replaced Distance at the top spot and sold over 510,000 units. This became Hamasaki's first greatest hits album to reach the top spot on that chart, and her fourth album overall.

The album stayed inside the top ten for nine weeks, the top 100 for 20 weeks, and eventually lasted 51 weeks in the top 300 chart. By the end of 2001, A Best placed second on the Annual Japanese Oricon Albums Chart with, behind Distance. Hamasaki's album had sold over 4.24 million units in Japan, whilst Utada's album sold 4.40 million. Hamasaki's album sales reached an excessive ¥12 billion (approximately $106124280 US dollar) by the end of the year, which hugely effected the stock prices of the company. A Best was certified sixteen-times-platinum (adjusted to 4x Million by June 2006) by the Recording Industry Association of Japan (RIAJ) with physical shipments of four million units in Japan. Additionally, the album is the second best-selling album of the 2000s decade in Japan.

Promotion

The promotion for A Best was extensive. Between March and April 2001, Hamasaki appeared in over 40 magazines within Japan. She travelled different areas in Japan to take part in the photo shoots, but was told several times to wait before commencing. Hamasaki appeared in several commercial advertisements, including the Takanoyuri Beauty Clinic print-only campaign "Pink Pink Festival". She also signed a deal with Japanese make-up company Kose Visee as their spokeswoman. Hamasaki became the spokeswoman for the KDDI Corporation subsidiary company Tu-Ka, which manufactured 2G PDC cellular operator's in three metropolitan areas (Tokyo, Nagoya, and Osaka). Hamasaki confirmed that she would perform two concerts in Tokyo, at their Tokyo Dome stadiums. During rehearsals of the tour, Hamasaki had to stop due to problems with her hearing in her left ear. Because of this, specific songs had to be cut from the concert tour because of its high frequency levels. Despite this, she did not postponed the rehearsals or concert dates due to tight scheduling. Hamasaki had been hospitalized a few times for consultations, but a doctor confirmed that continuing her to pursue music would result in permanent hearing loss. During some stage rehearsals at Tokyo Dome, Hamasaki became sick due to her hearing problems and could not finish the performances. Because of this, the rehearsals had to be hurried.

On July 6, 2001, the concerts first tour date, over 30,000 fans lined up for the show. However, tour organizers had asked them to wait longer due to Hamasaki's hospitalization. Hamasaki returned from the hospital, and was escorted to the stage with a wheelchair. Both concerts were commercial success, selling out on both tour dates, and made her one of few "top-drawer" Japanese artists to hold a concert at the Tokyo Dome. With sales from both the concert and album, Hamasaki was recognized as the top selling artist of 2001 with over 24 billion yen. In the aftermath of the tour, Hamasaki had become completely deaf in her left ear. She documented the condition, and publicly announced in January 2008 that she had been diagnosed with an inoprate ear condition (possibly tinnitus or Ménière's disease). Despite the setback, Hamasaki stated that she wished to continue singing, and that she would "not give up" on her fans and that "as a professional", she wanted to "deliver the best performance for everyone".

A live DVD was released on December 12, 2001 through Avex Trax. A limited edition VHS and DVD was released with different artwork and packaging. Through an exclusive deal with Sony, they released a limited edition PlayStation 2 musical video game entitled Visual Mix: Ayumi Hamasaki Dome Tour 2001 (2001). The video game is split into three sections; the visual mix (where the player uses the controller to change and direct the respective music videos and concert tour, alongside special effects editing), the Ayu-Mi-x studio (where the player can create and edit music through her songs "Unite!" and "Endless Sorrow"), and Ayu Browser (which is an online browser using customized Ayu settings).

Singles

"M" was released as the album's lead single on December 8, 2000., and was later included on her I Am... album in 2002. "M" was Hamasaki's first single she composed herself after her production team failed to compose a track in her liking. Upon its release, it garnered positive reviews from music critics. Many critics commended the song's composition, lyrical content, and highlighted the track as one of Hamasaki's best singles in her career. "M" was successful in Japan, peaking at number one on the Japanese Oricon Singles Chart by selling over 500,000 units in its first week of sales. It became Hamasaki's seventh number one single on that chart. By the end of 2001, "M" sold over 1.32 million units and was certified million by the Recording Industry Association of Japan (RIAJ) for exceeding one million shipments in that region. The single charted at number 87 on the Japan Billboard Adult Alternative chart. The single was certified platinum by RIAJ for selling over 250,000 digital units in Japan, tallying the single's sales to 1.76 million units as of 2014. The accompanying music video for the single was shot in Tokyo by Wataru Takeishi; it features Hamasaki inside a church, with scenes of her wearing a wedding dress and singing with her backup band in the rain.

"M" was re-released in Germany through Drizzly Records on November 3, 2003, with Hamasaki using her European stage name Ayu. The single was a triple re-release from the A Best and I Am... album, and the Ayu Trance compilation remix album, on a vinyl and CD Maxi single format. The re-released single was remixed by Above & Beyond, and was served as Ayu's second, first, and sixth international single in Germany, Spain, and North America. The accompanying music video for the remix single was shot in Tokyo by Masato Okazaki; it features several images and video shots of Hamasaki performance, whilst including different computer generated imagery.

Legacy

By 2007, A Best sold over 4.3 million units in Japan, making it the sixth best selling album in that region. This makes Hamasaki the second female artist to claim the spot; the other two entries were both by Utada. By 2010, Avex confirmed that it had sold 4.5 million units. With additional sales from digital purchases, A Best has sold over five million units in Japan, making this Hamasaki's best selling effort as of today.  Both Hamasaki and Utada's albums were the fastest selling albums of all time globally, having each sold nearly three million units.  The record was broken in 2015 by British musician Adele's studio album 25, which sold over 3.4 million units in the United States and reached number one on the US Billboard 200. The album was recognized as the third best selling album through digital store in 2014, and was placed second the following year.

The album has been cited by several publications as one of Hamasaki's best work to date. Alexey Eremenko from AllMusic stated that, whilst the album was a success, he noted that A Best was the moment that there was the "serious friction" between Hamasaki and her label; this was one of the first publicized rifts between the parties in Japan music history. In honour of the album's release, Hamasaki continued embroiling her studio albums with her symbolic "" logo. It was issued on her compilation albums; A Ballads (2003), the A Best 2 (2007) black and white editions, A Complete: All Singles (2008), A Summer Best (2012) and M(a)de in Japan (2016) where it's put in brackets. A Best also brought Hamasaki a number of accolades and award nominations. At the Annual 2001 Japan Gold Disc Awards, Hamasaki won Single of the Year for "M" and Domestic Artist of the Year. The following year, she won Domestic Artist of the Year again and Pop Album of the Year for A Best. At the 2001 World Music Awards, Hamasaki won the regional award for Best Japanese Act. At the 2002 MTV Asian Awards, Hamasaki won a special award entitled the Most Influential Asian Artist Award. At the first 2002 MTV Video Music Awards Japan, Hamasaki won the award for Best Female Artist, alongside nominations for Best Video of the Year and Best Pop Artist.

In retrospect of the album, Hamasaki had been interviewed in 2004 for the Nippon TV special documentary Light and Shadow: Despair and Decision at Age 25. She commented that she had been recognized severely as a "product" rather than a real person, and that she was considered the most "important product" to Avex. Hamasaki denied claims of retirement from the music industry, but threatened her position within Avex by wanting to separate from them. She furthered explained her staying with the companying; "I knew that if I didn't stay with the company, I'd never be able to come back to it. I'd live very thoroughly here, but I thought 'I just want to live like a human.' I was significant to them [Avex Trax], so I felt like 'lets fight the man' I guess. I wanted to resist the company even though I felt like I was part of it."

Re-issue
On January 28, 2016, Hamasaki announced via her official website the re-release of A Best. Hamasaki confirmed that the album would be released on the same date as the original album, and will be entitled the 15th Anniversary Edition. The album will include the original 16 tracks, but have been remastered by American engineer and producer Stephen Marcussen. This is Marcussen's first collaboration with Hamasaki, and mastered the album at his own Marcussen Studio's in Hollywood, California. The original album cover is used on both the cardboard sleeve and jewel case. Initial promotion of the album offered T-shirt designs of the six alternative jewel case album covers, handwritten lyrics to the album lyrics, and a specialized anniversary book. On one of Hamasaki's posts on her website, several Japanese public figures such as ice skater Mao Asada, Japanese model and actress Riisa Naka, music writer Mihi Fujii, and sociologist Noritoshi Furuichi took appreciation and retrospect in the collection and commended Hamasaki's longevity in the music industry.

The album is released in four formats; a standard CD, a CD and DVD bundle, a CD and Blu-ray bundle, and a digital release. All physical editions include the remastered 16 tracks, whilst the digital download includes three bonus a cappella versions of "A Song for...", "Trust", and "Depend on You". The DVD and Blu-ray bundles are housed inside a special box packaging, and features the music videos to ten of the tracks. On its opening day release, A Best: 15th Anniversary Edition debuted at number nine on the Oricon Daily Albums Chart with just over 2,000 units sold. To promote the album, Hamasaki will be appeared on the Japanese music television show Music Station on March 25, 2016. Hamasaki hosted a special website, where her fans used their Twitter accounts to "share" memories about the album; all entries were placed on the album cover's collage.

On the same day of the album's announcement, Hamasaki announced an arena concert tour in Japan entitled Made in Japan. The concert tour is an expansion of her New Year's Eve Countdown live show with the same name, and will be in support of A Best: 15th Anniversary Edition.

Track listing

Credits and personnel 
Credits adapted from the liner notes of the CD.

Ayumi Hamasaki – vocals, background vocals, song writing, composer and arrangement (under the alias Crea)
Max Matsuura – producer, manager
Akimisu Honma – keyboards
Naoki Hayashibe – guitar
Hiroshi Kitashiro – programming
Takahiro Iida – programming
Naoto Suzuki – keyboards, programming
Masayoshi Furukawa – guitar
Hidetoshi Suzuki – guitar
Jun Kajiwara – guitar
HΛL – programming, keyboards, composing
Dai "D.A.I." Nagao – composing, arrangement

Naoya Akimoto – guitar
Junko Hirotani – background vocals
Yasuhiko Hoshino – composing
Takashi Kimura – composing
Kazuhito Kikuchi – composing
Tsunku – composing
Takashi Kimura – arrangement
Takashi Morio – arrangement
Shingo Kobayashi – arrangement
Yasuaki Maejima – arrangement
Keita Haginiwa – photographer
Shigeru Kasai – designer
Avex Trax – Hamasaki's record label
Avex Music Creative Inc. – Hamasaki's record label

Charts

Sales
Oricon Sales Chart (Japan)

Total sales: 4,301,353 (Japan)
Total sales: 6,750,000 (Asia)

Release history

See also
List of fastest-selling albums worldwide
List of best-selling albums in Japan
List of Oricon number-one albums of 2001

Footnotes

Notes

References

External links
A Best – Ayumi Hamasaki's official website.
A Best: 15th Anniversary Edition – Ayumi Hamasaki's official website.

2001 greatest hits albums
Ayumi Hamasaki compilation albums
Avex Group compilation albums
Japanese-language albums